John Robinson McCravy (December 20, 1907 – April 19, 1991) was an American historian and politician.

His grandson, John R. McCravy III, also served in the South Carolina House of Representatives.

References

1907 births
1991 deaths
Clemson University alumni
Democratic Party members of the South Carolina House of Representatives
20th-century American politicians